Elicitation may refer to:
 Collecting intelligence information from people as part of human intelligence (intelligence gathering)
 Elicitation technique or elicitation procedure, any of various data collection techniques in social sciences or other fields to gather knowledge or information from people
 Expert elicitation, the synthesis of opinions of experts on a subject where there is uncertainty due to insufficient data
 Multiple EM for Motif Elicitation, a tool for discovering motifs in a group of related DNA or protein sequences
 Preference elicitation, the problem of developing a decision support system capable of generating recommendations to a user, thus assisting him in decision making
 Requirements elicitation, the practice of obtaining the requirements of a system from users, customers and other stakeholders
 Zaltman metaphor elicitation technique, a patented market research tool

See also 
 Elicitor